The 1975 Majestic International, also known as the Denver Women's Open,  was a women's tennis tournament played on indoor carpet courts at the Denver Auditorium Arena  in Denver, Colorado in the United States. The event was part of the USTA–WTA Summer/Fall Circuit of the 1975 WTA Tour. It was the fourth edition of the tournament and was held from September 22 through September 28, 1975. First-seeded Martina Navratilova won the singles title and earned $10,000 first-prize money.

Finals

Singles
 Martina Navratilova defeated  Carrie Meyer 4–6, 6–4, 6–3
 It was Navratilova's 4th singles title of the year and the 5th of her career.

Doubles
 Françoise Dürr /  Betty Stöve defeated  Rosemary Casals /  Martina Navratilova 3–6, 6–1, 7–6

Prize money

References

External links
  Women's Tennis Association (WTA) tournament event details

Majestic International 
Virginia Slims of Denver
Majestic International
Majestic International
Majestic International